Hyro the Hero, formerly Hyro Da Hero (born Hyron Louis Fenton Jr., July 18, 1987), is an American rapper from Houston, Texas, currently residing in Los Angeles, California.

Career 

Hyro moved to Los Angeles in November 2007, and shortly afterward released his first mixtape, Gangsta Rock, on Christmas Eve 2007 via iLike. His second mix tape, Rock & Roll Gangsta, released August 8, 2008, was dedicated to the memory of Ryan Halligan, who committed suicide after enduring years of bullying. His third mix tape, Belo Horizonte, named for a city in Brazil and released on Christmas Eve 2009, contained his first track with no samples, "Dirty South Rock".

Hyro recorded his debut album Birth, School, Work, Death which includes tracks produced by Ross Robinson featuring Paul Hinojos (At the Drive-in, the Mars Volta, Sparta) on bass, Daniel Anderson (Idiot Pilot, Glowbug) on guitar, and the Blood Brothers alumni Cody Votolato also on guitar, and Mark Gajadhar on drums.  Birth, School, Work, Death was released in the UK and Ireland on April 4, 2011, with worldwide release following later in the year.

Hyro embarked on his first tour with a full band in the UK and Ireland in April 2012,  with Welsh post-hardcore band the Blackout. Hyro also appeared on their single "Higher & Higher" from their album Hope.

In June, Hyro performed at Download Festival at Donington Park in England. After watching his Friday performance, the festival's promoter, Andy Copping, added Hyro to the 2nd stage on Sunday the 12th. Hyro also played on the Jägermeister Acoustic stage with his DJ and drummer, making him the first and only artist in the history of Download Festival to perform on 3 separate stages in the same year.  On the Saturday in between his Friday and Sunday performances, Hyro performed with Wu-Tang Clan in London and then again Edinburgh, Scotland the following Monday.

That same month, Hyro was nominated by Kerrang! as Best International Newcomer at the 2011 Kerrang! Awards.

Hyro Da Hero embarked on his first US tour with his current band later that summer, performing with Hollywood Undead and All That Remains on their 2011 summer tour. He was forced to cancel a UK tour in October/November.

2012–present 
In February 2012 Hyro returned to the UK for his first headline club tour. He also took part in Australia's Soundwave Festival in early March, appearing on the main stage in 4 cities: Brisbane, Sydney, Adelaide and Perth. Following the Soundwave Festival performances, Hyro went on tour with Mindless Self Indulgence on their US comeback tour in March and April 2012. He also appeared on the Vans Warped Tour 2012 and at the Summer Sonic Festival in Tokyo, Japan, August 18, 2012. During an Australian tour supporting Deftones, Fenton presented new material that was more hip hop based, which he is currently developing further. In the winter of 2016 Fenton entered the recording studio with producer Mitchell Marlow to work new material, resulting in 2018's Flagged Channel. Its lead single was "Bullet".

On September 25, 2020, Fenton released a single called "We Believe" featuring David Draiman of Disturbed.

Discography

Albums
Birth, School, Work, Death (2011) [as Hyro Da Hero]
Flagged Channel (2018)

Singles
"Ghetto Ambience" (2010) [as Hyro Da Hero]
"We Still Popular" (2011) [as Hyro Da Hero]
"Bullet" (2018) #30 Mainstream Rock Songs
 "Never Back Down" (feat. Myles Kennedy of Alter Bridge) (2018)
 "We Believe" (feat. David Draiman of Disturbed) (2020)
 "Fight" (feat. Chad Gray of Mudvayne/Hellyeah) (2020)
 "Retaliation Generation" (feat. Spencer Charnas of Ice Nine Kills) (2021)
 "Legendary" (feat. Brandon Saller of Atreyu) (2021)
 "FU2" (feat. AJ Channer of Fire from the Gods) (2021)

References

External links 

 
 Hyro the Hero on Artistdirect
Hyro The Hero on Revolver.com

1987 births
Living people
African-American rappers
African-American rock singers
Rappers from Houston
21st-century American rappers
Nu metal singers
Rap rock musicians
21st-century African-American musicians
20th-century African-American people